Hoopla (stylized as hoopla) is a web and mobile (Android/iOS) library media streaming platform launched in 2010  for audio books, comics, e-books, movies, music, and TV. Patrons of a library that supports Hoopla have access to its collection of digital media.

Hoopla Digital is a division of Midwest Tape.

Business model 
Hoopla is free-of-charge for patrons of participating libraries. The content is paid for by library systems, using a "per circulation transaction model".

Content 
Hoopla claims to have over 500,000 content titles across six formats. As of November 2016, Hoopla's content comprised 35% audiobooks (for which Hoopla has contracts with publishers such as Blackstone Audio, HarperCollins, Simon & Schuster Audio, Tantor Audio, and others), followed by 22% movies (for which Hoopla has motion picture contracts with publishers such as Disney, Lionsgate, Starz, Warner Bros., and others), 19% music, 12% ebooks, 6% comics, and 6% television.

Technology 
Hoopla content can be borrowed and consumed on the web, or via the native Android or iOS apps.

Parent company
John Eldred and Jeff Jankowski founded Hoopla's parent company, Midwest Tape, in 1989. Midwest Tape is a library vendor of physical media such as audiobooks, CDs, and DVD/Blu-ray.

Controversy
Hoopla and Midwest Tapes have been censured by the Library Freedom Project for hosting what it described as "fascist propaganda", including a recent English translation of A New Nobility of Blood and Soil by Richard Walther Darré of the SS and books related to Holocaust denial, in public library collections without the input from the staff. Criticism was also directed at the inclusion of books on homosexuality, abortion, and vaccines claimed by the Library Freedom Project to be misinformation. On February 17, 2022, Hoopla removed a number of titles after public outcry about Holocaust denial books available on the app under non-fiction.

See also
Kanopy
OverDrive

References

Digital media
Video on demand services
Online content distribution
Mass media companies of the United States